Headspace is a 2005 psychological horror film directed by Andrew van den Houten.  The screenplay was written by Steve Klausner and William M. Miller, based on a story by Troy McCombs.

Plot
Alex, a young man struggling with migraines, is sent to a hospital where he is told his brain uses the frontal lobe more than any normal person. Soon after, he begins hallucinating apparitions while murders are occurring around the city

Principal cast

Release
Headspace: The Director's Cut was released via cable and video on demand in North America on April 24 and via DVD & Blu-ray on 19 June 2012.

Critical reception
Neil Genzlinger of The New York Times:

From TV Guide:

References

External links

2005 films
American supernatural horror films
Films shot in New York (state)
Films scored by Ryan Shore
2000s English-language films
2000s American films